This is a list of Wikipedia articles about virtual communities.

Benchmark virtual communities

 Usenet, one of the original decentralized, distributed discussion group architectures. 
 BBS: The WELL, GEnie, The Meta Network
 Academic: EIES, Usenet
 Blog: LiveJournal, Xanga, MySpace, Facebook, WordPress, Blogger, TheStudentRoom, Tagged
 Webcomic: UserFriendly, Penny Arcade, Sluggy Freelance,
 Virtual world/city: LucasFilm's Habitat, Second Life, Millsberry, Red Light Center, IMVU, Neopets
 IM: ICQ, Yahoo! Messenger, Windows Live Messenger, AIM
 Internet Relay Chat (IRC): IRC networks
 MMORPG: EverQuest, Final Fantasy XI, RuneScape, World of Warcraft
 MOO: LambdaMOO
 Mososo: Dodgeball, Meetro
 MUD/MUSH: TinyMUD
 P2P: Kazaa, Morpheus, Napster, Limewire
 Wiki: Wikipedia, WikiWikiWeb, MeatballWiki, Wetpaint, PBworks, TV Tropes
 WWW: eBay, GeoCities, Slashdot, Digg
 Consumers: eBay, Amazon.com
 Software that enable online communities: Ning

Additional virtual community listings

Discussion boards

 reddit
 Hacker News
 Dead Runners Society
 4chan
 GameFAQs
 Something Awful
 Fark
 2channel
 Zombie Squad
 IGN
 TOTSE

Social networking

Art communities

 Albino Blacksheep
 DeviantArt
 Dulwich OnView
 Elfwood
 Newgrounds
 Tumblr

MUD, MUSH, MOO

 :Category:MUD games
 :Category:MU* servers
 :Category:MU* games

Virtual world communities

 :Category:Virtual world communities

Virtual reality communities

 :Category:Virtual reality communities

Ethnicity-based communities

 1Point3Acres
 Fillos de Galicia
 MIT BBS

Online Teaching Covens
 Coven of the Far Flung Net

Other types

 Pinboard
 bianca.com
Scratch (an educational programming website by MIT)
 GameTZ.com (an online game, music, movie, and book trading community)
 CouchSurfing (free accommodation worldwide through hospitality exchange)
 Hospitality Club (free accommodation worldwide through hospitality exchange)
 Warm Showers (free accommodation worldwide through hospitality exchange for bicycle travelers)
 Meetup (an online service designed to facilitate real-world meetings of people involved in various virtual communities)
 Meetro (local focused communities)
 StumbleUpon (web surfing)
 Woozworld (virtual gaming community for youth)
 YTMND (Picture, Sound, Text)
 Group blogs
 TakingITGlobal (Youth - social networking for social good)
 CrossFit (a fitness program where users post their scores and comments on daily workouts)
 DXY.cn (an online community for physicians, health care professionals, pharmacies and facilities)

See also
 List of virtual communities with more than 1 million users
 List of social bookmarking websites
 List of social networking websites
 List of Internet forums
 Lists of websites
 Support group

virtual